The 1977 California Angels season involved the Angels finishing fifth in the American League West with a record of 74 wins and 88 losses.

Offseason 
On January 6, 1977, Angels utility infielder Mike Miley died in a one-car accident in Baton Rouge, Louisiana.

Notable transactions 
 November 16, 1976: Don Baylor was signed as a free agent by the Angels.
 November 17, 1976: Joe Rudi was signed as a free agent by the Angels.
 November 24, 1976: Bobby Grich was signed as a free agent by the Angels.
 January 11, 1977: Daryl Sconiers was drafted by the Angels in the 3rd round of the 1977 Major League Baseball draft.

Regular season

Season standings

Record vs. opponents

Opening Day lineup 
1 Jerry Remy 	2B
2 Bobby Grich 	SS
3 Bobby Bonds 	RF
4 Don Baylor 	DH
5 Joe Rudi 	LF
6 Tony Solaita 	1B
7 Bruce Bochte 	CF
8 Dave Chalk 	3B
9 Terry Humphrey C
P Frank Tanana

Notable transactions 
 June 7, 1977: 1977 Major League Baseball draft
Richard Dotson was drafted by the Angels in the 1st round (7th pick).
Brian Harper was drafted by the Angels in the 4th round.
 June 13, 1977: Dick Drago was traded by the Angels to the Baltimore Orioles for Dyar Miller.
 June 15, 1977: Craig Hendrickson (minors) was traded by the Angels to the Cincinnati Reds for Gary Nolan.
 September 16, 1977: Carlos May was purchased by the Angels from the New York Yankees.

Roster

Player stats

Batting

Starters by position 
Note: Pos = Position; G = Games played; AB = At bats; H = Hits; Avg. = Batting average; HR = Home runs; RBI = Runs batted in

Other batters 
Note: G = Games played; AB = At bats; H = Hits; Avg. = Batting average; HR = Home runs; RBI = Runs batted in

Pitching

Starting pitchers 
Note: G = Games pitched; IP = Innings pitched; W = Wins; L = Losses; ERA = Earned run average; SO = Strikeouts

Other pitchers 
Note: G = Games pitched; IP = Innings pitched; W = Wins; L = Losses; ERA = Earned run average; SO = Strikeouts

Relief pitchers 
Note: G = Games pitched; W = Wins; L = Losses; SV = Saves; ERA = Earned run average; SO = Strikeouts

Farm system

Notes

References

External links 
1977 California Angels at Baseball-Reference
1977 California Angels at Baseball Almanac

Los Angeles Angels seasons
California Angels season
California Angels